Ngaire 'Sue' Susan Stott is a New Zealand paediatric orthopaedic surgeon, and as of 2019 is a full professor at the University of Auckland and holds a position at Starship Hospital.

Academic career
After an undergrad  at the University of Auckland and a 1997 PhD at University of Southern California titled  'Regulation of chondrogenesis in vitro : the role of hedgehog and Wnt genes' , Stott joined the staff at Auckland University,  rising to full professor in 2013. Stott has multiple research fundings and holds multiple roles, including ministerial appointments.

Selected works
 Senthi, Suren, Phil Blyth, Russell Metcalfe, and Ngaire Susan Stott. "Screw placement after pinning of slipped capital femoral epiphysis: a postoperative CT scan study." Journal of Pediatric Orthopaedics 31, no. 4 (2011): 388–392.
 Zhang, Shiran, Nichola C. Wilson, Anna H. Mackey, and Ngaire Susan Stott. "Radiological outcome of reconstructive hip surgery in children with gross motor function classification system IV and V cerebral palsy." Journal of Pediatric Orthopaedics B 23, no. 5 (2014): 430–434.
 Poutawera, Vaughan, and Ngaire Susan Stott. "The reliability of computed tomography scanograms in the measurement of limb length discrepancy." Journal of Pediatric Orthopaedics B 19, no. 1 (2010): 42–46.

References

Living people
New Zealand women academics
Year of birth missing (living people)
University of Southern California alumni
Academic staff of the University of Auckland
University of Auckland alumni
New Zealand orthopaedic surgeons
Women surgeons